Lee Sun-fung (1 June 1909 - 21 May 1985) was a Chinese film director, writer and actor from Hong Kong.

Early life 
On 1 June 1909, Lee was born in Guangdong, Qing Empire.

Career 
Between 1940 and 1978, Lee has directed over 50 Hong Kong films. Three of his films were included in the Hong Kong Film Awards' list of "Best 100 Chinese Motion Pictures" in 2005: The Orphan (1960), Cold Nights (1955), and Feast of a Rich Family (1959), which he co-directed with Lee Tit, Ng Wui and Lo Ji-Hung.
Lee is credited with over 60 films as director, over 50 films as writer, and over 15 films as actor.

Filmography

Films 
This is a partial list of films.
 1941 The Metropolis 
 1955 Cold Nights - Director, writer.
 1960 The Orphan - Director 
 1972 The Loner - Director

Personal life 
Lee's wife is Yuet-ching Lee, an actress. Lee's third son is Sil-hong Lee. On 21 May 1985, Lee died.

References

External links
 
 The Cinema of Lee Sun-fung at the Hong Kong Film Archive via archive.is
 Lee Sun Fung at hkcinemagic.com

Film directors from Guangdong
Hong Kong film directors
1909 births
1985 deaths
Chinese film directors